The Glynhill Ladies International (formerly the Braehead Ladies International) is an annual bonspiel, or curling tournament, that takes place at the Braehead Curling Rink in Renfrew, Scotland, just outside Glasgow. The tournament, sponsored by Glynhill Hotel, has been a part of the World Curling Tour since 2008. The tournament is held in a round robin format.

Past champions
Only skip's name is displayed.

References

External links
Home Page 
Braehead Curling Club Home

Women's World Curling Tour events
Sport in Renfrewshire
Curling in Scotland
Women's curling competitions in Scotland
Champions Curling Tour events